Tallow is a rendered form of beef or mutton fat, primarily made up of triglycerides.

In industry, tallow is not strictly defined as beef or mutton fat. In this context, tallow is animal fat that conforms to certain technical criteria, including its melting point. Commercial tallow commonly contains fat derived from other animals, such as lard from pigs, or even from plant sources.
 The adjacent diagram shows the chemical structure of a typical triglyceride molecule.

The solid material remaining after rendering is called cracklings, greaves, or graves. It has been used mostly for animal food, such as dog food.

In the soap industry and among soap-making hobbyists, the name tallowate is used informally to refer to soaps made from tallow.  Sodium tallowate, for example, is obtained by reacting tallow with sodium hydroxide (lye, caustic soda) or sodium carbonate (washing soda).  It consists chiefly of a variable mixture of sodium salts of fatty acids, such as oleic and palmitic.

Composition

The composition of the fatty acids is typically as follows:
Saturated fatty acids:
Palmitic acid (C16:0): 26%
Stearic acid (C18:0): 14%
Myristic acid (C14:0): 3%
Monounsaturated fatty acids:
Oleic acid (C18-1, ω-9): 47%
Palmitoleic acid (C16:1): 3%
Polyunsaturated fatty acids:
Linoleic acid: 3%
Linolenic acid: 1%

Uses

Tallow is used mainly in producing soap and animal feed.

Food
A significant use of tallow is for the production of shortening. It is also one of the main ingredients of the Native American food pemmican. Before switching to pure vegetable oil in 1990, McDonald's cooked its French fries in a mixture of 93% beef tallow and 7% cottonseed oil. According to a 1985 article in The New York Times, tallow was also used for frying at Burger King, Wendy's, Hardee's, Arby's, Dairy Queen, Popeyes, and Bob's Big Boy. Tallow is, however, making a comeback in certain nutrition circles. See also roux.

Greaves

Greaves (also graves) or cracklings is the fibrous matter remaining from rendering, typically pressed into cakes and used for animal feed, especially for dogs and hogs, or as fish bait. In the past, it has been both favored and shunned in dog food.

Fuel

Biodiesel
Tallow can be used for the production of biodiesel in much the same way as oils from plants are currently used.

Aviation fuel
The United States Air Force has experimented successfully with the use of beef tallow in aviation biofuels. During five days of flight testing from August 23 to 27, 2010, at Edwards Air Force Base, California, a U.S. Air Force C-17 Globemaster III flew using JP-8 conventional jet fuel in three of its engines and a 50/50 blend of JP-8 and HRJ biofuel made from beef tallow in one engine on August 23, followed by a flight with the same 50/50 blend in all four engines on August 24. On August 27, it flew using a blend of 50% JP-8, 25% HRJ, and 25% coal-based fuel made through the Fischer–Tropsch process, becoming the first United States Department of Defense aircraft to fly on such a blend and the first aircraft to operate from Edwards using a fuel derived from beef tallow.

Printing
Tallow also has a use in printmaking, where it is combined with bitumen and applied to metal print plates to provide a resistance to acid etching.

The use of trace amounts of tallow as an additive to the substrate used in polymer banknotes came to light in November 2016. Notes issued in 24 countries including Canada, Australia, and the United Kingdom were found to be affected, leading to objections from vegans and members of some religious communities.

Candles

Tallow once was widely used to make molded candles before more convenient wax varieties became available—and for some time after since they continued to be a cheaper alternative. For those too poor even to avail themselves of homemade, molded tallow candles, the "tallow dip"—a reed that had been dipped in melted tallow or sometimes a strip of burning cloth in a saucer of tallow grease—was an accessible substitute. Such a candle was often simply called a "dip" or, because of its low cost, a "farthing dip" or "penny dip".

Lubrication
Early in the development of steam-driven piston engines, the hot vapors and liquids washed away most lubricants very quickly. It was soon found that tallow was quite resistant to this washing. Tallow and compounds including tallow were widely used to lubricate locomotive and steamship engines at least until the 1950s. (During World War II, the vast fleets of steam-powered ships exhausted the supply, leading to the large-scale planting of rapeseed because rapeseed oil also resisted the washing effect.) Tallow is still used in the steel rolling industry to provide the required lubrication as the sheet steel is compressed through the steel rollers. There is a trend toward replacing tallow-based lubrication with synthetic oils in rolling applications for surface cleanliness reasons.

Another industrial use is as a lubricant for certain types of light engineering work, such as cutting threads on electrical conduit.  Specialist cutting compounds are available, but tallow is a traditional lubricant that is easily available for cheap and infrequent use.

The use of tallow or lard to lubricate rifles was the spark that started the Indian Mutiny of 1857. To load the new Pattern 1853 Enfield Rifle, the sepoys had to bite the cartridge open. It was believed that the paper cartridges that were standard issue with the rifle were greased with lard (pork fat), which was regarded as unclean by Muslims, or tallow (cow fat), which is incompatible with Hindu dietary laws. Tallow, along with beeswax, was also used in the lubricant for American Civil War ammunition used in the Springfield rifled musket. A combination of mutton tallow, paraffin wax and beeswax is still used as a patch or projectile lubricant in present-day black powder arms.

Tallow is used to make a biodegradable motor oil by a Stamford, Connecticut–based company called Green Earth Technologies.

Tallow is also used in traditional bell foundry, as a separation for the false bell when casting.

Industrial
Tallow can be used as flux for soldering.

Balms and beauty products
Tallow has a long history in humanity of being used to soothe and moisturize skin, and the word for sebum (the fat naturally produced by human skin) is the same as that for tallow in some languages, including Latin.

As tallow is rendered animal fat, the composition of the tallow oil is similar to the composition of human skin's natural sebum. This makes it often a suitable moisturiser for individuals who have sensitivities of commercial moisturisers. Tallow contains Vitamins A, D, K, E, & B12, conjugated Linoleic Acid (CLA) with natural anti-inflammatory properties, oleic acid (omega 9), palmitic acid, and stearic acid, which have beneficial healing and soothing properties. 

While tallow can be useful for skincare there are stability issues that prevent it from mainstream commercialisation. It does not always have a consistent color, appearance, and odor from batch to batch.

Textiles

Mutton tallow is widely used as starch, lubricant and softener in textile manufacturing. Pretreatment processes in textiles include a process called sizing. In sizing, a chemical is necessary to provide required strength to yarns mounted on the loom. Mutton tallow provides required strength and lubrication to the yarns.

Mutton tallow is also used as softener in textile finishing. Tallow dimethyl ammonium chloride is the most common example.

See also 
Suet
 Dripping

References 

Animal fat products
Cooking fats
Garde manger
Animal fats